Khashaat ("fenced") is a sum (district) of Arkhangai Province in central Mongolia. The economy is based on herding. Khashaat is primarily known for several monuments left by an ancient Turkic empire. Khashaat's terrain is steppe, with no woodland, unlike many other sums in Arkhangai. In 2009, its population was 3,344.

References 

Populated places in Mongolia
Districts of Arkhangai Province